PDX may refer to:

Places
Portland, Oregon, US
Portland International Airport (IATA code)
Portland Union Station (railway code)

Brands and enterprises
PDX, a line of musical instruments and equipment by Vestax
Paradox Interactive, a Swedish video game publisher
Paradox Development Studio, the in-house game development team of the above

Computing and technology
Paradox (warez), a warez–demogroup; an anonymous group of software engineers that devise ways to defeat software and video game licensing protections, a process known as cracking

Science and healthcare
Pancreatic and duodenal homeobox protein, a transcription factor
Patient-derived xenograft, human tumor grown in mice
PDX, principal diagnosis (see Medical diagnosis#Concepts related to diagnosis), the main cause of a patient's need for treatment

Other uses
PDX.edu, domain name of Portland State University, Oregon
Performance Driving eXperience, an event sanctioned by the Sports Car Club of America

See also
KPDX, a television station in the Portland, Oregon area